Sławomir Mordarski (born 4 January 1979 in Nowy Sącz) is a Polish slalom canoeist who competed at the international level from 1994 to 2006.

He won three medals at the ICF Canoe Slalom World Championships with a gold (C1 team: 1999) and two bronzes (C2 team: 2002, 2003). He also won a silver medal in the C2 team event at the 1996 European Championships in Augsburg. Mordaski also competed in two Summer Olympics, earning his best finish of sixth in the C2 event in Sydney in 2000.

His partner in the C2 boat for most of his active career was Andrzej Wójs (1995-2005). He was also partnered by Marcin Pochwała (2006).

His older brother Ryszard is also an Olympic slalom canoeist.

World Cup individual podiums

References

1979 births
Canoeists at the 1996 Summer Olympics
Canoeists at the 2000 Summer Olympics
Living people
Polish male canoeists
Olympic canoeists of Poland
Sportspeople from Nowy Sącz
Medalists at the ICF Canoe Slalom World Championships